This is a list of all stations of the Nagpur Metro, a rapid transit system serving the city of Nagpur in the Vidarbha region of Maharashtra, India.

Nagpur Metro is the 13th metro system in India.

It is built and operated by the Maharashtra Metro Rail Corporation Limited Its first section inaugurated on 7 March 2019 and opened for public on 8 March 2019, with the Orange Line. On 26 January 2020, the Aqua line was partially inaugurated.

Metro stations 

The list given has only operational stations alphabetically-

Statistics

See also 

 Nagpur Metro
 Aqua Line (Nagpur Metro)
 Orange Line (Nagpur Metro)
 Maharashtra Metro Rail Corporation Limited

Other Metro systems in India

References 

Nagpur Metro

Nagpur-related lists